Viktor Galović was the defending champion but lost in the semifinals to Adrián Menéndez Maceiras.

Daniel Brands won the title after defeating Menéndez Maceiras 7–5, 6–3 in the final.

Seeds

Draw

Finals

Top half

Bottom half

References
Main Draw
Qualifying Draw

Guzzini Challenger - Singles
2018 Singles